Russell Alfred Awkard (October 7, 1917 – April 1, 2002) was an American Negro league outfielder in the 1940s.

A native of Howard County, Maryland, Awkard initially played for the Washington Royals, and joined the New York Cubans in 1940. Awkard was a World War II veteran, having served in the US Army's Quartermaster Corps in England, France and Belgium.  He was considered to be one of the Negro league's finest players. He was featured in an article in USA Today titled "The Name is Awkard, with one W."  in 1993.  Prior to his death, he met with Bill Clinton along with other Negro league players arranged by Bob Hieronimus.

References

External links
 and Seamheads

1917 births
2002 deaths
New York Cubans players
Newark Eagles players
African Americans in World War II
United States Army personnel of World War II
Baseball outfielders
21st-century African-American people
African-American United States Army personnel